Selesnick is a surname. Notable people with the surname include:
Ivan Selesnick, American engineer
Richard Selesnick (born 1964), American artist, one half of Kahn & Selesnick